Redemption Road is the sixty-first album by American folk singer-songwriter Tom Paxton, released in March 2015.

Overview
Over a period of 60 days, from 30 July 2014 to 28 September 2014, Tom Paxton called on Kickstarter's services in order to finance his new studio album, collecting a $32,177 pledge (of $20,000 goal) from 552 backers. Though the album was not officially released until 10 March 2015, it was actually recorded in 2014, and can be fully streamed on Tom's official SoundCloud page since 6 January 2015.

Track listing 
All songs by Tom Paxton unless otherwise noted.
"Virginia Morning" - 3:42 
"Susie Most of All" - 2:31 
"Time to Spare" - 3:55 
"The Losing Part" - 3:48 
"Skeeters'll Gitcha" - 2:23 
"Ireland" - 4:08 
"Come On, Holy" (Tom Paxton, Jon Vezner) - 2:56 
"If the Poor Don't Matter" - 3:26 
"The Mayor of MacDougal Street" - 4:01 
"Central Square" - 4:40 
"Buffalo Dreams" - 4:17 
"The Battle of the Sexes" - 2:55 
"Redemption Road" (Geoff Bartley, Tom Paxton) - 3:44 
"The Parting Glass" (Traditional) - 1:37

Personnel

Musicians
Tom Paxton – lead vocal, acoustic guitar, arranger
Al Perkins - dobro 
Cathy Fink - banjo, vocal harmony 
Tim Crouch - fiddle, mandolin 
Geoff Bartley - National steel guitar 
Robin Bullock - cittern, acoustic guitar 
Mark Howard - acoustic guitar  
Dave Pomeroy - upright bass 
Pete Wasner - piano, Wurlitzer 
Kirk "Jelly Roll" Johnson - harmonica 
John Mock - whistle 
Pat McInerney - drums

Vocalists
Suzi Ragsdale - Vocal harmony 
John Wesley Ryles - Vocal harmony 
Marcy Marxer - Vocal harmony 
John Prine - Quotation author, lead vocal on "Skeeters'll Gitcha" 
Janis Ian - Vocal harmony on "Redemption Road"

Production and cover art
Jim Rooney - Producer 
David Ferguson - Engineer, mixing 
Cathy Fink - Cover photo, engineer, executive producer, inside photo 
Pete Wasner - Engineer 
Sean Sullivan - Assistant engineer, mixing assistant 
Dave Shipley - Mastering

References

2015 albums
Tom Paxton albums